Leandro Fernandes Dias (born September 20, 1985) is a Brazilian footballer who plays for Mes Kerman F.C. in the Iran Pro League.

Club career
Fernandes Dias joined Mes Kerman in 2010 after spending the previous season  at Americano in the Campeonato Brasileiro Série C.

 Assist Goals

References

External sources
 Profile at Persianleague

1985 births
Living people
Brazilian footballers
Brazilian expatriate footballers
Expatriate footballers in Iran
Sanat Mes Kerman F.C. players
Americano Futebol Clube players
Paulista Futebol Clube players
Vitória Futebol Clube (ES) players
Grêmio Barueri Futebol players
Sociedade Esportiva do Gama players
Sportspeople from Minas Gerais
Association football defenders